

List of Landforms in India 
 List of glaciers in India
 List of volcanoes in India
 List of valleys India
 List of rivers in India
 List of lakes in India

See also

Rivers of India: Saraswathi, Kaveri, Ganga, Indus,Yamuna and so more...